Majd ad-Dīn Ibn al-Athīr ash-Shaybānī (1149–1210) was an  historian, biographer and lexicographer. His full name was Abū l-Saʿādāt al-Mubārak b. Muḥammad (al-Athīr) b. Muḥammad b. ʿAbd al-Karīm b. ʿAbd al-Wāḥid al-Shaybānī al-Jazarī al-Mawṣilī.
Majd ad-Dīn was one of three brothers from a wealthy family of scholars, all known as Ibn al-Athīr of Jazirat Ibn ‘Umar and Mosul.  The other two being  Ali ibn al-Athir and Diyā' ad-Dīn, who was also an historian. The father Muḥammad b. ‘Abd al-Karim was an official of the Zangid government.  Majd al-Dīn  was in the service of the emir of Mosul, Ghāzi b. Mawdūd, and later Mas‘ūd b. Mawdūd and Arslan Shāh. Although he  became paralysed he continued working and outlived his two brothers. He was a distinguished translator of the Arabic language.  The Ibn al-Athīr family were Arab, or Kurdish,  of the Shayban lineage of the large and influential Arab tribe Banu Bakr, who lived across upper Mesopotamia, and gave their name to the city of Diyar Bakr.

Works

Al-Nihāya fi gharib al-ḥadīth; compiled in 1322. (Cairo, 1893, 1963-65); dictionary of rare words from the ḥadīth and their meanings. The great thirteenth-century lexicographer Ibn Manzur cited this and other works among the sources for his famous dictionary Lisān al-‘Arab.
Kitāb al-Banīn wa-'l-banāt wa 'l-ābā’ wa 'l-ummahāt wa 'l-adhwā’ 
a.k.a. Kitāb al-Muraṣṣa, on family names,  (ed., C Ferdinand Seybold, Weimar, 1896.)
Al-Mukhtār fī manāqib al-akhyār
Rasā’il; collection of epistles. (ed., Brockelmann)
Jāmi‘ al-uṣūl;  (Helmut Ritter, Oriens, vi, 1953)
 Lost works on naḥw (grammar), tafsīr (Qur’ānic exegesis), and other subjects.

References

1149 births
1210 deaths
Emirs